General John Regan is a 1921 British comedy film directed by Harold M. Shaw and starring Milton Rosmer, Madge Stuart and Ward McAllister.

The film was made by Stoll Pictures at Cricklewood Studios. It is based on the play General John Regan by George A. Birmingham. It was remade as a sound film General John Regan in 1933.

Cast
 Milton Rosmer as Doctor O'Grady
 Madge Stuart as Mary Ellen Doyle
 Edward O'Neill as Tim Doyle
 Ward McAllister as Horace P. Billings
 Bertie Wright as Thady Gallagher
 Teddy Arundell as Police Const. Moriarty
 Robert Vallis as Sergeant Colgan
 Judd Green as Kerrigan
 Gordon Harker as Maj. Kent
 Wyndham Guise as Father McCormack

References

Bibliography
 Goble, Alan. The Complete Index to Literary Sources in Film. Walter de Gruyter, 1999.

External links

1921 films
1921 comedy films
Films directed by Harold M. Shaw
British comedy films
Films set in Ireland
British silent feature films
Stoll Pictures films
Films shot at Cricklewood Studios
British black-and-white films
1920s English-language films
1920s British films
Silent comedy films